Hyeokgeose of Silla (69 BC – 4 AD, r. 57 BC–4 AD), also known by his personal full name as Bak (Park, Pak) Hyeokgeose (朴赫居世), was the founding monarch of Silla, one of the Three Kingdoms of Korea. He was the progenitor of all Bak (Park) clans in Korea.

Name 
His title Geoseogan (Hangul: 거서간 Hanja: 居西干) or Geoseulhan (Hangul: 거슬한 Hanja: 居瑟邯), means "king" in the language of the Jinhan confederacy, the group of chiefdoms in the southeast of the Korean Peninsula.

"Hyeokgeose" was not a personal name, but the hanja for his honorific name, pronounced "Bulgeunae" (Hangul: 불그내; Hanja: 弗矩内) in archaic Korean, meaning "bright world." 赫 hyeok, a Chinese character that means "bright, radiant, glowing" (from doubling the character for 赤 jeok "red"), is used to transcribe the Korean adjective stem 븕 bylg- > 붉 bulg- "red" (< ancient Korean word for "red; brightly colored; bright"). 居 geo, a Chinese character that means "live, dwell, reside, sit," is used to transcribe the Korean prenominal adjective inflection ㄴ -n ~ 은 -eun "~ that is (bright/red), ~ which is (bright/red)." 世 se, a Chinese character that means "generation; world; era," is used to transcribe an ancient word related to the obsolescent Korean word 뉘 nuy ~ 누리 nuri "world."

Founding legend 
The Samguk Sagi and Samguk Yusa describe the founding of Silla by Hyeokgeose.

Refugees of Gojoseon lived in the valleys of present-day Gyeongsang-do, South Korea, in six villages called Yangsan (Hangul:양산촌 Hanja:楊山村), Goheo (Hangul:고허촌 Hanja:高墟村), Jinji (Hangul: 진지촌 Hanja: 珍支村), Daesu (Hangul: 대수촌 Hanja: 大樹村), Gari (Hangul: 가리촌; Hanja: 加利村), and Goya (Hangul: 고야촌; Hanja: 高耶村).

In 69 BC, the heads of the six chiefdoms gathered to discuss forming a kingdom and selecting a king. In the forest, at a well called Najeong at Yangsan, a strange light shone from the sky (some accounts describe the simultaneous rising of the sun and moon, as well as a volcanic eruption), and a white horse descended. Chief Sobeolgong of Goheo discovered a large egg there. A boy came out of the egg, and when bathed, his body radiated light and birds and beasts danced. The egg was gourd-shaped, which has been posited as the origin of the Bak (Park, Pak) name, as it aligns with the Korean word for gourd (박, bak).

Sobeolgong raised him, and the six chieftains revered him. The chieftains made him king when he became 13 years old. The state was named Seorabeol.

Upon becoming king, he married Lady Aryeong, who is said to have been born from the ribs of a dragon.

A different version of the legend claims Hyeokgeose was a son of Lady Saso who was from a Chinese royal family and moved to the Jinhan confederacy.

Historical context 
This legend reflects developments in the city-state stage, the six chieftains representing a loose group of Gojoseon refugees. The story implies the ascendency of the Bak clan over the native peoples, and may indicate horse and sun worship.

The founding date is widely questioned today, as the Samguk Sagi was written from the viewpoint of Silla, claiming Silla's superiority and antiquity over Goguryeo and Baekje. Silla in this traditional thinking is thought to have been founded first, followed by Goguryeo, and then Baekje. Archaeological evidence, however, paints a different picture, and it is suspected that Goguryeo is the oldest of the three kingdoms, with Silla developing either concurrently with Baekje or after it.

Reign 
According to the Samguk Sagi, Hyeokgeose and his queen traveled the realm in 41 BC, helping the people improve their harvests. The people praised them as the Two Saints or Two Holy Ones (Hangul: 이성; Hanja: 二聖).

In 37 BC Hyeokgeose built Geumseong (Hangul: 금성; Hanja: 金城) in the capital city (present-day Gyeongju), and in 32 BC he built a royal palace inside.

The Chinese Lelang commandery invaded in 28 BC but seeing that the people enjoyed piles of grain and did not lock their doors at night, called Silla a moral nation and retreated.

In 20 BC, the king of the Mahan confederacy demanded a tribute. Silla sent Hogong, who was a minister of Silla. The king was angry that Silla sent Hogong and not a tribute. Hogong criticized the king's impoliteness with fortitude. The king was angry at him and tried to kill him, but nearby subordinates stopped the king, and he was permitted to return to Silla.

In 19 BC, Hyeokgeose also sent an emissary upon the death of the Mahan king. In 5 BC, East Okjeo (a small state to the north, later conquered by Goguryeo) sent an emissary, and Hyeokgeose presented him with 20 horses.

According to Samguk Yusa, in the 61st year(4 CE), one day he went up to the sky, and eight days later, his body was scattered on the ground. And the queen also follows the king and dies. The people of the country tried to bury them, but a large snake appeared and disturbed them. Accordingly, the head and limbs were buried separately to create five tombs (五陵), and the name of the tomb was called Sareung. It is called Sareung (蛇陵) because snake (蛇) protect the tomb.

Death and succession 
Hyeokgeose ruled for around 60 years, and set the foundation for a kingdom that would unify much of the Korean Peninsula in 668.

Hyeokgeose maintained control over his kingdom and was one of the few Park rulers to hold complete power over Silla. He died at age 73, and was buried in Sareung, north of Dameomsa (south of Namcheon). Hyeokgeose was succeeded by his eldest son Namhae.

Legacy 
Though not much is known about Hyeokgeose, his many legacies and reminders survive to this day. One of them being his numerous descendants, the Park clans of Korea, who are numbered as the third largest group of people with a common last name. All the Park clans in Korea trace their ancestry back to the first king of Silla, Bak Hyeokgeose. Another legacy was the kingdom that he established. The fact that he founded the Silla kingdom remained under high respects and great consideration by Gyeongju Gim (Kim) (김, 金) clan and Wolseong Seok (석, 昔) clan throughout Silla's history.

Family

See also
 Bon-gwan
 The Legend of the Evil Lake
Park (Korean surname)
Silla

References

Notes 

69 BC births
AD 4 deaths
Silla rulers
1st-century BC rulers in Asia
1st-century monarchs in Asia
Founding monarchs
1st-century Korean people
1st-century BC Korean people